Streptopetalum arenarium is a subshrub native to Somalia, Africa. It is distylous, grows up to 0.5 meters tall, has elliptic to ovate leaves, and racemes flowers. It was originally described by Mats Thulin.

References 

Passifloraceae
Flora of Somalia
Plants described in 1990